The I Bolivarian Games (Spanish: Juegos Bolivarianos) were a multi-sport event held between August 6–22, 1938, in Bogotá, Colombia, at the Estadio El Campín, for the city's 400th anniversary. The Games were organized by the Bolivarian Sports Organization (ODEBO).

The Games were officially opened by Colombian president Alfonso López Pumarejo, accompanied by Alberto Nariño Cheyne from the Colombian Olympic Committee, Colonel Leopoldo Piedrahita from the local organizing committee, and Gustavo Santos, mayor of the city of Bogotá.

A detailed history of the early editions of the Bolivarian Games between 1938
and 1989 was published in a book written (in Spanish) by José Gamarra
Zorrilla, former president of the Bolivian Olympic Committee, and first
president (1976-1982) of ODESUR.  Gold medal winners from Ecuador were published by the Comité Olímpico Ecuatoriano.

The official posters for the Games were designed by Colombian artist Sergio Trujillo Magnenat.

Historical photos 

Further photos can be found on the webpage of the Luis Ángel Arango Library.

Participation 
A total of 716 athletes from 6 countries were reported to participate:

 (70)
 (250)
 (110)
 (74)
 (112)
 (100)

Sports 
The following sports were mentioned:

Aquatic sports
 Diving
 Swimming
 Water polo
 Athletics
 Baseball
 Basketball
 Boxing
 Chess
 Cycling
 Equestrianism
 Fencing
 Football
 Golf
 Pelota al Guante†
 Shooting
 Tennis
 Volleyball
 Weightlifting
 Wrestling

†: Exhibition event.

The list might be incomplete.

Medal count 
The medal count for these Games is tabulated below. This table is sorted by the number of gold medals earned by each country.  The number of silver medals is taken into consideration next, and then the number of bronze medals.

References 

 
Bolivarian Games
Bolivarian Games
Bolivarian Games
Bolivarian Games
Bolivarian Games
Multi-sport events in Colombia
20th century in Bogotá
Sports competitions in Bogotá
August 1938 sports events